Kim Weiskopf (April 10, 1947 — April 22, 2009) was an American television writer and producer, whose credits included Three's Company, Married... with Children, One Day at a Time, The Jeffersons and Good Times. Kim was the son of fellow TV producer/writer/director Bob Weiskopf.

Born in New York City, he had solo writer-producer credits on such shows as Rachel Gunn, R.N., Full House, and Married... with Children. They once had its own production company North Ave. Productions, based at 20th Century Fox Television. In 1984, he transferred, along with Baser moved to Columbia Pictures Television.

Weiskopf's writing and producing career - much of it with longtime writing partner Michael S. Baser - spanned from 1972 with Rod Serling's radio show, The Zero Hour in the 1970s, to What's Happening Now, and to Married... with Children in the 1980s and early/mid 1990s.

Education
He moved to Los Angeles with his family at the age of five and attended Grant High School in Van Nuys, 
and San Francisco State University.

Death
He died from pancreatic cancer in the Encino neighborhood of Los Angeles on April 22, 2009, 12 days after his 62nd birthday. He was survived by his wife Jody and daughter Kate.

References

External links

 L.A. Times obituary

1947 births
2009 deaths
Television producers from New York City
American television writers
American male television writers
Deaths from pancreatic cancer
People from Greater Los Angeles
Writers from New York City
San Francisco State University alumni
Screenwriters from New York (state)
20th-century American screenwriters
20th-century American male writers